Elia Nasrallah (born 17 August 1942) is a Lebanese sports shooter. He competed in the mixed trap event at the 1984 Summer Olympics.

References

1942 births
Living people
Lebanese male sport shooters
Olympic shooters of Lebanon
Shooters at the 1984 Summer Olympics
Place of birth missing (living people)